Archibald Lamond Robertson, also known as Lammie Robertson, (born 27 September 1947 in Paisley) is a Scottish retired footballer who played in the Football League for Burnley, Bury, Halifax Town, Brighton & Hove Albion, Exeter City, Leicester City, Peterborough United and Bradford City.

His last Football League appearance was for Bradford City against Torquay United on 13 September 1980.

After his playing career finished he became an independent financial advisor and scout for Sheffield United.

References

1947 births
Living people
Scottish footballers
Scottish expatriate footballers
Burnley F.C. players
Bury F.C. players
Halifax Town A.F.C. players
Brighton & Hove Albion F.C. players
Exeter City F.C. players
Chicago Sting (NASL) players
Leicester City F.C. players
Peterborough United F.C. players
Bradford City A.F.C. players
English Football League players
North American Soccer League (1968–1984) players
Expatriate soccer players in the United States
Association football midfielders
Scottish expatriate sportspeople in the United States